The Zohr gas field is an offshore natural gas field located in the Egyptian sector of the Mediterranean Sea. The field was discovered in 2015 by the Italian energy company Eni and is the largest ever natural gas find in the Mediterranean Sea, almost twice the size of the nearby Leviathan gas field. If confirmed, Zohr will almost double Egypt's gas reserves.

See also

Energy in Egypt
World Largest Gas Fields

References

Natural gas fields in Egypt